Gründau is a municipality in the district Main-Kinzig, in Hesse, Germany.

Geography

Neighbouring places
Gründau is located near Gelnhausen and Büdingen.

Division of the municipality

Gründau is a municipality that consists of seven villages, with a population of 14,653 in total (populations as of December 2021):
 Lieblos (pop. 3,761)
 Rothenbergen (pop. 3,979)
 Niedergründau (pop. 1,806)
 Mittel-Gründau (pop. 2,165)
 Hain-Gründau (pop. 1,753)
 Breitenborn (pop. 1,089)
 Gettenbach (pop. 461)

History
Most of the villages are mentioned in church registers since the 11th century.

Religious affiliation
54.1% Protestants
18.9% Catholics
27% other faiths

Twin towns
 Laussonne, Département Haute-Loire (43), Auvergne, France
 Neugersdorf, Saxony (Sachsen), Germany

References

External links
 Official site 

Municipalities in Hesse
Main-Kinzig-Kreis